Alison Wheeler (born 22 July 1986) is a French comedian and actress.

Wheeler initially earned recognition as a member of the French cooperative Studio Bagel, a website that was later acquired by the television channel Canal+. She has an established cinematic career and is known for creating and performing musical parodies on France Inter.
She currently works as a weekly humorist for the French Talk show “Quotidien”, on the private television channel TMC.

Biography

Biography and early television
Of French-Irish origin, Alison Wheeler was born on July 22, 1986, in Enghien-les-Bains in Val-d'Oise. After graduating with a Baccalauréat diploma in humanities at Notre-Dame-de-Bury High School, (Margency), she took comedy classes at Cours Florent and Studio Pygmalion. She also studied at the university Paris-Sorbonne IV.

After having participated in several television series and co-hosted the show Kawai on Filles TV alongside Louise Bourgoin, Wheeler won a role in the Saphia Azzeddine's adaption of Azzeddizine's novel Mon père est femme de ménage. Her performance as the big sister who dreams of becoming a musical star earned her a nomination for the 2012 Césars as "most promising actress". She continued on to earn a small role in the biopic My Way, by Florent Emilio Siri, also released in 2012.

During the same year, Wheeler established her internet presence: first on the site MadmoiZelle.com and later through the internet cooperative Studio Bagel, which she joined in season 2, and which provided her with a wider audience. When Studio Bagel was acquired by the television channel Canal+, Wheeler became one of television's most prominent faces. She took part in the show Le Dézapping du Before, broadcast during le Before du Grand Journal, on the programme Carte de Presque and occasionally on the Grand Journal'''s JT de l'invité on Canal+. However, Wheeler's most recognizable work began on September 9th, 2014, as a presenter for the Grand Journal weather on Canal + with Monsieur Poulpe. She left Le Grand Journal in spring of 2015 to focus on cinema.

Transition to cinema and musical parodies
After a few small roles in popular comedies - Fonzy, by Isabelle Doval and À toute épreuve by Antoine Blossier - Wheeler acted in the dramedy Memories, by Jean-Paul Rouve, released in 2014.

However, Wheeler's new focus on cinema did not signal a total depart from news media, and in October 2015 she founded the column (Journal intime fictif) in the Antoine de Caunes's weekly show L'émission d'Antoine, broadcast on Canal+. On May 23, 2016, she launched her first video on her YouTube channel, "La chanteuse de salle de bain". The next fall Wheeler joined the Nagui show La Bande originale on France Inter as a comedic commentator, with her column La Drôle d'humeur d'Alison Wheeler, where she is recognized for her imitations and musical parodies. This garnered her a widespread audience and landed her further cinematic roles, first for the Patrick Mille comedy Going to Brazil, and then as Déborah François's co-star in the romantic comedy Loue-moi !, directed by Coline Assous and Virginie Schwartz. Both films received poor public reception and were deemed flops in 2017, despite significant media coverage for the first.

Filmography
Web videos

Audio fiction
2017: L'Épopée temporelle: Aliénor

Television
2013: Clem (season 3, episodes 2 and 3): Laura
2015: Objectivement'' (Arte): la lampe

Cinema

Awards and nominations

See also
Le Grand Journal (Canal+)
Maxime Musqua
Jérôme Niel

References

External links

 
 
 

French actresses
Internet memes
French people of Irish descent
Cours Florent alumni
Paris-Sorbonne University alumni
1986 births
Living people